The Fly V Australia was an Australian road cycling team. The team was sponsored by Australia airline V Australia, and competed on the UCI Continental Tour. Riders on the team included Jonathan Cantwell, Bernard Sulzberger, Henk Vogels, David Kemp and David Tanner. The team found some success in the USA.

References

Cycling teams based in Australia
UCI Continental Teams (Oceania)
Cycling teams established in 2009
Cycling teams disestablished in 2011
Defunct cycling teams based in Australia